Frederick High School is a public high school in Frederick, Colorado, United States, about 40 miles north of Denver.  It is a four-year public school serving grades 9 through 12. It is one of the largest schools in the St. Vrain Valley School District, with an enrollment of around 1,300 in 2022.

The school is part of the St. Vrain Valley School District. In addition to Frederick, the school primarily serves students from the nearby communities of Firestone and Dacono but has students from as far away as Johnstown and Fort Morgan.

The school colors are Navy Blue and Gold and the mascot is the Golden Eagle. The Golden Eagle became the school's mascot after Colorado Senate Bill 21-116 was passed, which levied severe financial penalties for public schools in the state with Native American mascots (the school's mascot was formally the Warrior).

The current building is the third iteration of Frederick High School in Colorado. The original Frederick High School was established in 1907 but closed in 1961 due to school consolidation. The second school, located at 600 Fifth Street, opened in 1979 and was a middle-high school serving grades 6 through 12. The middle and high schools separated in 2012, with Frederick High School moving into its current location at 5690 Tipple Parkway and the former high school becoming Thunder Valley Middle School. 

Its theatre department, Troupe 4391, is regarded as one of the best in Colorado. It’s taken multiple of its shows to various theatre ceremonies and events such as the Colorado Thespian Conference. 

The school hosts a biomedical science magnet program as well as a PTECH program, which pairs students with local tech firms and college coursework to earn them an associate's degree at graduation. The school is also known for its sports teams regularly making playoffs.

Notable alumni 
Thomas Beeker - Brodway and television actor

References

External links
 
 The Frederick Lantern, Frederick's student newspaper

Educational institutions established in 2012
2012 establishments in Colorado
Public high schools in Colorado
Schools in Weld County, Colorado